Acrobelione is a genus of Isopoda parasites, in the family Bopyridae, containing the following species:

Acrobelione anisopoda Bourdon, 1981
Acrobelione halimedae Boyko, Williams & Shields, 2017
Acrobelione langi Van Name, 1920
Acrobelione reverberii Restivo, 1970

References 

Isopod genera
Parasites
Cymothoida